Emilia Dragieva (née Petkanova (Петканова); born 11 January 1965) is a Bulgarian former track and field athlete who specialised in the high jump.

Career
Dragieva emerged during a period of very high quality Bulgarian women high jumpers.

She reached the peak of her career shortly after at the 1987 IAAF World Indoor Championships. She cleared  in the final to take the bronze medal behind fellow Bulgarian Kostadinova and Germany's Susanne Beyer. This performance ranked her third in the world indoors that year. Her jump was also the best ever indoors by a European under-23 athlete. This record lasted until 2002, when Marina Kuptsova improved it by three centimetres.

Greek jumper Niki Bakoyianni improved this differential by a centimetre in 1996, clearing a height 33 centimetres greater than her height.

After retiring from competition she remained involved in the sport and was the venue co-ordinator for the 2015 European Team Championships events that were held in Stara Zagora.

International competitions

References

External links

Living people
1965 births
Bulgarian female high jumpers
World Athletics Indoor Championships medalists
20th-century Bulgarian women